Nedžad Žerić (born 6 August 1972) is a Bosnian retired football player, who currently is football manager. Besides Bosnia and Herzegovina, he has played in Israel.

Club career
He was captain of Rudar Prijedor for four seasons and had a three-year spell in Israel.

International career
Žerić made his debut for Bosnia and Herzegovina in a September 1997 World Cup qualification match away against Croatia and has earned a total of 2 caps, scoring no goals. His second and final international was a November 1997 friendly match away against Tunisia.

Managerial career
In September 2015, Žerić earned his UEFA coaching license, the second former Rudar Prijedor player to do so after Željko Buvač.

He was expected to take over managerial duties from Igor Janković at Kozara Gradiška in 2019 after earlier leading the charges at Jedinstvo Bihać, Rudar Prijedor and Podgrmeč, where he had succeeded Alen Mešanović in February 2016. He only lasted two months at Podgrmeč, though. He replaced Selam Tulić at Jedinstvo in January 2017, but left the club after saving them from relegation in June 2017.

He had worked as an assistant to head coach Velimir Stojnić at Rudar and temporarily took over when Stojnić was sacked in March 2013.

References

External links

Profile - NFSBIH

1972 births
Living people
People from Prijedor
Association football midfielders
Bosnia and Herzegovina footballers
Bosnia and Herzegovina international footballers
NK Jedinstvo Bihać players
NK Travnik players
FK Rudar Prijedor players
Hapoel Tzafririm Holon F.C. players
Premier League of Bosnia and Herzegovina players
First League of the Federation of Bosnia and Herzegovina players
Israeli Premier League players
Bosnia and Herzegovina expatriate footballers
Expatriate footballers in Israel
Bosnia and Herzegovina expatriate sportspeople in Israel
Bosnia and Herzegovina football managers
NK Jedinstvo Bihać managers
FK Rudar Prijedor managers
FK Kozara Gradiška managers